Sturmtruppen is an Italian comic series.

Sturmtruppen, German for "Storm trooper", may also refer to:
 Sturmtruppen (film), a 1976 Italian film
Sturmtruppen: The Videogame, a 1992 videogame

See also
Stormtrooper (disambiguation)